Lucien Van Impe (born 20 October 1946) is a Belgian cyclist, who competed professionally between 1969 and 1987. He excelled mainly as a climber in multiple-day races such as the Tour de France. He was the winner of the 1976 Tour de France, and six times winner of the mountains classification in the Tour de France.

Biography
Van Impe credits the start of his career to Spaniard Federico Bahamontes, a climber nicknamed the eagle of Toledo and a former Tour de France winner.  In 1968 van Impe was King of the Mountains in the Tour de l'Avenir. Bahamontes used his influence to get van Impe a contract as a professional. In 1969, Van Impe started his professional career with a 12th place in the 1969 Tour de France.
In 1971, Van Impe won his first mountains classification in the Tour de France. He would repeat that five more times, a record then shared with Bahamontes. When Richard Virenque broke the record with a seventh victory in 2004, Van Impe criticized Virenque for being opportunistic rather than the best climber; he said he had himself refrained from breaking Bahamontes' record himself out of reverence.

Van Impe's Sonolor team fused with Gitane to become Gitane-Campagnolo in 1975. Former French champion Cyrille Guimard, who retired in early 1976, became directeur sportif in 1976. He was considered to be among the pre-race favorites as this edition had eight high mountain stages and it was expected to be a battle between Van Impe, Joop Zoetemelk and defending champion Bernard Thevenet. Thevenet was no match for these two riders from the Low Countries in the 1976 edition, and despite a strong start from debutant Freddy Maertens, the race became a duel between Van Impe and Zoetemelk with the mountains of the 1976 Tour de France deciding who would become champ. Guimard claims it was his order to attack Zoetemelk that won Van Impe the Tour, shouting at Van Impe that he'd run him off the road with the car if he didn't attack. Van Impe has denied this. Despite Zoetemelk winning three high mountain stages Van Impe's attack gave him a lead of more than +3:00 on the Dutchman, and he then clinched his victory by finishing more than a minute ahead of Zoetemelk in the final individual time trial. 

After 1976, Van Impe changed teams. In the 1977 Tour de France he started favorite but failed to take a lead in the mountains. He waited until the last mountain stage to attack, which finished atop Alpe d'Huez, and was in the lead late in the stage but forgot to eat, which caused his lead to slip away. He was still in the lead when he was hit by one of the TV cars. Due to his team car being so far behind he had to stand on the side of the road and wait several minutes for a new bike as Bernard Thévenet and Hennie Kuiper rode past; and the 1977 edition would be decided between the two of them as a result.

After three years where he wasn't among the GC favorites, Van Impe rode incredibly well in the 1981 Tour de France. He finished on the podium in 2nd place, although he was more than +10:00 behind Bernard Hinault, however he won the mountain classification yet again. All total Van Impe finished in the top 5 of the Tour de France eight times.

He also won the mountain classification in the Giro d'Italia twice.

Single-day races were not his specialty and it was a surprise that he won the national championship in 1983.

Van Impe started 15 Tours de France and reached the finish in Paris every time. This was a record when he finished his last, but he would be passed for most Tour finishes by Joop Zoetemelk in 1986, and eventually Sylvain Chavanel reached 16 finishes in 2018. He is currently tied for 2nd with Viatcheslav Ekimov who finished his 15th edition in 2006.

He is now head of a cycling team of professional riders, called .

Lucien Van Impe lives in Impe  (his family name refers to that town) with his wife Rita, he has two grown up children, a son and a daughter. His house is called Alpe D'Huez, after the French mountain where he took the yellow jersey (the leader in the Tour de France) in 1976. When he came home that year, the bar where his supporters gathered every day to watch him win the Tour, was painted yellow entirely.

During and after his professional career, Van Impe has never tested positive, refused a doping test or confessed having used doping.

He has been honoured by a tasteful abstract statue on his bike, on a stone plinth on a small roundabout in Belgium at 180km before the finish of Belgium's blue-ribband event, the Tour of Flanders.

Career achievements

Major results

1968
 1st Stage 8 Tour de l'Avenir
1969
 1st Overall Vuelta Ciclista a Navarra
 1st Stage 6 Tour of Belgium
1971
 3rd Overall Tour de France
 1st  Mountains classification
1972
 4th Overall Tour de France
 1st  Mountains classification
 1st Stage 12
1973
 5th Overall Tour de France
 1st Stage 12b
 2nd Overall Tour de Romandie
 1st Stage 3
 1st Stage 3 GP du Midi-Libre
1975
 3rd Overall Tour de France
 1st  Mountains classification
 1st Stages 14 & 18
 1st Overall Tour de l'Aude
 1st Stage 1 & 3 
1976
 1st  Overall Tour de France
 1st Stage 14
 2nd Overall GP du Midi-Libre
 1st Stage 4b
 1st Stage 2b Tour de l'Aude
1977
 3rd Overall Tour de France
 1st  Mountains classification
 1st Stage 15b
 3rd Overall Critérium du Dauphiné
 1st Stage 6
 2nd Overall Tour de Suisse
 1st Stages 7 & 8
1979
 5th Overall Vuelta a España
 1st Stage 15
 1st Stage 16 Tour de France
 1st Stage 7b Volta Ciclista a Catalunya
1981
 2nd Overall Tour de France
 1st  Mountains classification
 1st Stage 5
1982
 4th Overall Giro d'Italia
 1st  Mountains classification
1983
 1st  National Road Race Champion
 4th Overall Tour de France
 1st  Mountains classification
 1st Stage 19
 9th Overall Giro d'Italia
 1st  Mountains classification
 1st Stage 11
1986
 1st Overall Vuelta a los Valles Mineros
 1st Stage 1

Grand Tour general classification results timeline

Notes

External links
Cycling hall of fame biography

Belgian male cyclists
Belgian Tour de France stage winners
Tour de France winners
Belgian Vuelta a España stage winners
1946 births
Living people
Cyclists from East Flanders
Tour de Suisse stage winners
People from Erpe-Mere